Brachioxena is a genus of moths belonging to the subfamily Olethreutinae of the family Tortricidae.

Species
Brachioxena lutrocopa (Meyrick, 1914)
Brachioxena niveipalpis (Meyrick, 1938)
Brachioxena pakistanella (Amsel, 1968)
Brachioxena psammacta (Meyrick, 1908)
Brachioxena sparactis (Meyrick, 1928)

See also
List of Tortricidae genera

References

External links
tortricidae.com

Eucosmini
Tortricidae genera
Taxa named by Alexey Diakonoff